Alan Christian Holt (born June 29, 1939) is a retired American Olympic sailor in the Star class. He competed in the 1972 Summer Olympics together with Richard Gates, where they finished 10th.

References

External links
 
 
 

1939 births
Living people
American male sailors (sport)
Olympic sailors of the United States
Sailors at the 1972 Summer Olympics – Star
Star class sailors
Sportspeople from Seattle